Teixeira is a Portuguese parish, located in the municipality of Seia. The population in 2011 was 187, in an area of 15.92 km2.

References

Freguesias of Seia